The Bliss-Leavitt Mark 6 torpedo was a Bliss-Leavitt torpedo developed and produced by the E. W. Bliss Company in 1911. It employed a main engine that was a horizontal turbine rather than the vertical turbine used on all other Bliss-Leavitt torpedoes. The Mark 6's depth and gyro controls were also combined into one integrated unit. About 100 units were manufactured by E.W. Bliss. It was used on cruisers, destroyers and submarines of the E, F, G and H classes.  The Mark 6 and all other torpedoes designed before Bliss-Leavitt Mark 7 torpedo, were considered obsolete and withdrawn from service in 1922.

See also
American 18 inch torpedo

References

Torpedoes
Torpedoes of the United States
Unmanned underwater vehicles
Bliss-Leavitt torpedoes